SC Rotor Volgograd is a Russian professional football club from the large city of Volgograd, Volgograd Oblast (formerly Stalingrad). The club will play in the third-tier Russian Football National League 2 in the 2022–23 season. They are the largest and best supported Volgograd club and for most of their existence have been the city's only representatives in the national league system. 

They played at the top level of Soviet/Russian football either side of World War II, from 1989 to 1990, from 1991 to 2004 and in the 2020—21 season. During the 1990s they were one of the strongest clubs in newly independent Russia and qualified for European competition four times. In recent years financial and ownership difficulties have repeatedly threatened their professional status and they have played mostly in lower regional leagues. 

The team currently plays its home games at the Volgograd Arena since 2018.

History
Both the current team name and the former name "Traktor" are references to the Stalingrad Tractor Factory, once a major producer of tractors, and the scene of heavy fighting during the Battle of Stalingrad during World War II.

Soviet era 
The creation of a Russian national football pyramid immediately prior to World War II propelled Traktor Stalingrad to national prominence. Traktor were champions of the new fourth-level Group G in 1937, and were then promoted straight to the highest-level Group A as it expanded from 9 clubs to 26. They remained at the top level until 1950.

Rotor then spent three decades at the top regional level, although the creation of the Supreme League in 1970 pushed their league from the second level overall down to the third. They gradually improved throughout the 1970s and finally won Zone III of the Soviet Second League (the third tier) in 1980 and 1981, and were successful in the promotion playoffs the second time.

In 1988 Rotor finished second in the Soviet First League, earning promotion to the Soviet Top League. They finished 13th and last in the downsized 1990 competition after the Georgian and Lithuanian teams withdrew, and the decision was made to relegate them. However they bounced straight back as champions of the First League in 1991, thus becoming founder members of the new Russian Top Division after the USSR collapsed.

Top Division/Premier League and Europe 
In the mid-1990s, Rotor was one of the strongest clubs in Russia, rivalling Spartak Moscow for the championship, yet never winning it. Rotor became the league runners-up in 1993 and 1997.

Rotor played five successive seasons in European competition, from 1994–95 to 1998–99. They qualified for the UEFA Cup through their league position every year except 1996–97, when they instead chose to enter the Intertoto Cup. Unfortunately for Rotor, the fall of communism had left all the former Eastern Bloc leagues badly under-resourced compared to their Western counterparts, and indeed Rotor were knocked out by all four of the French and Italian clubs they played. The exception came against England's Manchester United in 1995–96. Having drawn the home leg 0–0, Rotor raced into a 2–0 lead at Old Trafford before United scored their first goal. Rotor were seconds away from being the first European club to win at Old Trafford when United's goalkeeper Peter Schmeichel scored a famous equaliser, but the 2–2 draw meant Rotor progressed by the away goals rule. They went on to be defeated by eventual Runners-up Bordeaux in the second round.

Full European results:

 QR: Qualifying round

In the 2000s, Rotor's results declined, and in 2004, the team finished last in the Russian Premier League. The club's owner Vladimir Goryunov, a member of the Duma and head of the parliamentary sports committee, explored options to save Rotor from relegation, such as expanding the Premier League to 20 teams. But in January 2005 Rotor were unable to make the required financial guarantees and so lost their professional licence entirely.

2005–2014: Financial troubles and decline 
Rotor's reserve side in the Russian Second Division, Rotor-2 Volgograd, became the club's first team and was renamed Rotor in 2006. In 2007 local businessman Oleg Mikheev acquired the club's main asset the Volgograd Central Stadium, and with it effective control over the club, but financial troubles continued and the team's performances in the Second Division declined.

Matters came to a head in 2009. Russia had officially launched its bid for the FIFA World Cup 2018 and Volgograd city was in line for a new stadium - provided they had a professional club to fill it after the tournament. Rotor, facing legal action and a transfer embargo due to their financial status, were not reliable candidates. The government created a new entity, FC Volgograd, intending to assume the Rotor name. In fact, Rotor managed to co-exist with the new FC for the first half of the 2009 season, before Mikheev suspended operations and the government took ownership of the club and stadium from him. The two clubs were merged into one, and the new Rotor Volgograd were promoted to the second-level Russian Football National League thanks to teams above them withdrawing.

The regional Ministry of Sport invested 150 million roubles ($4.9m) in the club's playing budget for the 2010 campaign, but it ended in failure as Rotor were relegated in 17th place. Governor Brovko admitted that the transition to the higher level was made too quickly. Former club player Sergei Nechay took over management and steered the team to promotion as champions of their Second Division zone in 2011–12. This time they were able to consolidate in the National League, finishing 9th and then 14th.

But financial troubles continued. A Ministry of Sport investigation found evidence of financial misconduct by club management along with substantial overspending, and regional Governor Andrey Bocharov announced after the 2013 season that government support for Rotor was being withdrawn. The club dropped back into the Second Division (renamed the Professional Football League) for the first half of the 2014–15 (autumn-spring) season, then withdrew in order to immediately transfer to the 2015 (spring-autumn) Russian Amateur Football League, the fourth level overall.

2015–present: Revival and a new decline
In the 2015 season Rotor won the Amateur League Chernozemye (South-West Region) division at the first attempt by 11 points, suffering only one defeat in 22 games. The 45,000-seater Pobeda Stadium is under construction on their old Central Stadium site, and it was reported in August 2015 that the first team are still interested in moving into the facility after the 2018 World Cup, which makes attaining a higher league status a priority. They were licensed for third-tier Russian Professional Football League for the 2016–17 season. They won their zone of the PFL in the 2016–17 season and were promoted to the second-level Russian National Football League for 2017–18.

Despite ending the 2017–18 season in the relegation zone, the club stayed in the league for the 2018–19 season as another team that finished above them in the table failed to obtain the league license.

On 15 May 2020, FNL season was abandoned due to the COVID-19 pandemic in Russia. As Rotor was in the 1st position in the standings, they were promoted to the Russian Premier League for the 2020–21 season, returning to the top level after a 16-year break.

In the 2020–21 Russian Premier League season, Rotor only was able to score 15 goals in 30 games, and finished in 15th place, leading to relegation back to FNL after one season in the top tier. They also were awarded two losses due to a COVID-19 outbreak in the squad. In the 2021–22 Russian Football National League, Rotor finished 18th out of 20 clubs, suffering second consecutive relegation.

Honours

Leagues
Soviet Top League/Russian Premier League (first tier)
Runners-up: 2 (1993, 1997)
Soviet/Russian First League (second tier)
Winners: 2 (1991, 2019–20)
Runners-up: 1 (1988)
Soviet/Russian Second League (third tier)
Winners: 2 (1981, 2011–12)
Runners-up: 2 (1979, 1980)
Soviet Second League B/Russian Amateur Football League (fourth tier)
Winners: 2 (1937, 2015 (Chernozemye Region))

Cups
Russian Cup
Runners-up: 1 (1995)
King's Cup (Thailand)
Winner: 1 (1995)

Current squad
As of 22 February 2023, according to the Second League website.

Reserve squad

Historical names
Traktorostroitel Stalingrad (1929~1936)
Dzerzhinets-STZ Stalingrad (1936)
Traktor Stalingrad (1937~47)
Torpedo Stalingrad (1948~57)
Traktor Stalingrad (1958~60)
Traktor Volgograd (1961~69)
Stal Volgograd (1970~1971)
Barrikady Volgograd (1972~1974)
Rotor Volgograd (1975~2004)
Rotor-2 (2005)
Rotor (2006~2009,2010~2014)
Rotor Volgograd (2015~2018)
Rotor (2018~)

Notable players
Had international caps for their respective countries. Players whose name is listed in bold represented their countries while playing for Rotor.

Russia/USSR
 Anatoli Zinchenko
   Oleg Sergeyev
 Aleksandr Ponomarev
 Valeri Kleimyonov
  Igor Lediakhov
 Evgeni Aldonin
 Aleksei Bakharev
 Albert Borzenkov
 Maksim Buznikin
 Andrei Chichkin
 Aleksei Gerasimenko
 Yevgeni Makeyev
 Nikolai Olenikov
 Roman Pavlyuchenko
 Aleksei Rebko
 Aleksandr Shmarko
 Oleg Veretennikov
 Roman Vorobyov
 Valeri Yesipov
 Denis Zubko

Armenia
 Khoren Bayramyan
 Armen Manucharyan

Belarus
 Dzmitry Kamarowski
 Andrei Kovalenko
 Ivan Mayewski
 Dzmitry Rawneyka

Estonia
 Sergei Pareiko

Georgia
 Giorgi Arabidze
 Zuriko Davitashvili
 Solomon Kvirkvelia
 Beka Mikeltadze

Kazakhstan
 Vitaliy Abramov
 Yuri Aksenov
 Valeri Korobkin
 Andrei Miroshnichenko
  Vladimir Niederhaus
 Aleksey Shchotkin
 Dmitri Shomko
 Sergei Zhunenko

Latvia
 Ivans Lukjanovs

Malawi
 Essau Kanyenda

Moldova
 Alexandr Covalenco

Tajikistan
 Andrei Manannikov

Ukraine
 Yuri Hudymenko
 Yuri Kalitvintsev
 Hennadiy Orbu
 Ihor Zhabchenko

Uzbekistan
 Vitaliy Denisov
 Yaroslav Krushelnitskiy
 Vladimir Radkevich

Venezuela
 Andrés Ponce

References

External links

  
Fans' website  
ROTOR Fans History on fan site
Rotor's Return: Goals, Ghosts and Stalingrad

 
Association football clubs established in 1929
Football clubs in Russia
Sport in Volgograd
1929 establishments in Russia
Soviet Top League clubs
Works association football clubs in Russia